Euryomyrtus recurva is a shrub endemic to Western Australia.

It blooms between July and September producing white-pink flowers.

It is found on catchment slopes and in gravel pits in the Wheatbelt, Mid West and Goldfields-Esperance regions of Western Australia  where it grows in sandy-clay soils.

References

Eudicots of Western Australia
recurva
Endemic flora of Western Australia
Plants described in 2001
Taxa named by Malcolm Eric Trudgen